Bukkapattana  is a village in the southern state of Karnataka, India. It is located in the Sira taluk of Tumkur district in Karnataka.

Demographics
As of 2001 India census, Bukkapattana had a population of 6108 with 3111 males and 2997 females.

Location 
Bukkapattana village surrounded by Sira town to the east, Huliyar and Kenkere town to the west and Hagalavadi Town to the south.

See also
Hagalavadi
 Tumkur
 Districts of Karnataka

References

External links
 http://Tumkur.nic.in/

Villages in Tumkur district